Elk Falls Provincial Park is a provincial park in British Columbia, Canada.

The Park was established in 1940 to protect the waterfall and canyon. In 1947, the John Hart Dam and Generating Station was completed, followed by two other dams upstream, Strathcona and Ladore. Most of the water that used to flow over the falls is now diverted for power production. A suspension bridge over the canyon was completed in 2015, and provides a good view of Elk Falls.

References

External links
Official website
John Hart Dam

Provincial parks of British Columbia
Mid Vancouver Island
Waterfalls of British Columbia
1940 establishments in British Columbia
Protected areas established in 1940